Iran: Journal of the British Institute of Persian Studies is an annual peer-reviewed academic journal covering Iranian studies. Its first editor was Laurence Lockhart; other editors included Georgina Herrmann, C. Edmund Bosworth, Vesta Sarkhosh Curtis, and Cameron A. Petrie. It has published scholarship by Louis D. Levine, Inna Medvedskaya, Roger Moorey, Michael Roaf, T. Cuyler Young, and Ran Zadok among others.

British Institute of Persian Studies
The journal is published by the British Institute of Persian Studies, an entity established in 1961 in Tehran as a "cultural institute, with emphasis on history and archaeology." Among its members: Basil Gray and Pirouz Mojtahedzadeh. The Institute also maintains a library.

References

External links
 
 British Institute of Persian Studies

Annual journals
English-language journals
Publications established in 1963
Iranian studies journals
Academic journals published by learned and professional societies